The canal latéral à la Marne is a  long canal in the Marne department in north-eastern France. It connects Vitry-le-François to Épernay, and includes 15 locks. It overcomes a height difference of 34 meters and runs parallel to the river Marne.

References

External links
 Navigation guide Places, ports and moorings on the canal.

Marne